Gordon Paul Gallagher (born 1970) is an American lawyer and jurist serving as a United States magistrate judge of the United States District Court for the District of Colorado. He is a nominee to serve as a United States district judge of the same court.

Education 
Gallagher earned a Bachelor of Arts from Macalester College in 1991 and a Juris Doctor from the Sturm College of Law at the University of Denver in 1996.

Career 
Gallagher spent most of his career in the Colorado Western Slope region. In 1996 and 1997, Gallagher worked as an associate at Underhill and Underhill P.C., representing small businesses. From 1997 to 2000, he served as a deputy district attorney in the Mesa County District Attorney's Office. He has operated his own solo practice since 2000, focusing on criminal defense, and has worked as a federal magistrate judge of the District of Colorado since October 12, 2012, sitting in Grand Junction, Colorado. As a magistrate judge, he oversaw petty offense and misdemeanor cases on federal lands in the western part of the state.

From 2002 until his appointment as a magistrate judge in 2012, Gallagher was a contracted attorney with the Colorado's Office of the Alternate Defense Counsel, representing indigent defendants who could not be represented by the Office of the Colorado State Public Defender due to a conflict. Gallagher has also represented the Southern Ute Indian Tribe and Ute Mountain Ute Tribe. He has been a member of the District Court's Pro Se Working Group and the Grand Valley Task Force's Criminal Justice Working Group.

Nomination to district court 

On August 2, 2022, U.S. Senators Michael Bennet and John Hickenlooper recommended Gallagher, Sundeep Addy and Kato Crews for two vacancies on the U.S. District Court for the District of  Colorado. On September 2, 2022, President Joe Biden announced his intent to nominate Gallagher to serve as a United States district judge of the United States District Court for the District of Colorado. On September 6, 2022, his nomination was sent to the Senate. President Biden nominated Gallagher to the seat being vacated by Judge William J. Martínez, who will assume senior status on February 10, 2023. He was the first Colorado Western Slope resident to be appointed to a federal Article III judgeship since 1989. Gallagher was unanimously rated "well qualified" for the judgeship by the American Bar Association's Standing Committee on the Federal Judiciary. 

On December 13, 2022, a hearing on his nomination was held before the Senate Judiciary Committee. On January 3, 2023, his nomination was returned to the President under Rule XXXI, Paragraph 6 of the United States Senate. He was renominated on January 23, 2023. On February 9, 2023, his nomination was reported out of committee by a 14–7 vote. On March 2, 2023, the Senate invoked cloture on his nomination by a 50–41 vote.
His nomination is pending before the United States Senate.

References 

1970 births
Living people
20th-century American judges
20th-century American lawyers
21st-century American judges
Colorado lawyers
District attorneys in Colorado
Macalester College alumni
People from Louisville, Kentucky
Sturm College of Law alumni
United States magistrate judges
University of Denver alumni